In spherical geometry, an -gonal hosohedron is a tessellation of lunes on a spherical surface, such that each lune shares the same two polar opposite vertices. 

A regular -gonal hosohedron has Schläfli symbol  with each spherical lune having internal angle radians ( degrees).

Hosohedra as regular polyhedra 

For a regular polyhedron whose Schläfli symbol is {m, n}, the number of polygonal faces is :

The Platonic solids known to antiquity are the only integer solutions for m ≥ 3 and n ≥ 3. The restriction m ≥ 3 enforces that the polygonal faces must have at least three sides.

When considering polyhedra as a spherical tiling, this restriction may be relaxed, since digons (2-gons) can be represented as spherical lunes, having non-zero area.

Allowing m = 2 makes

and admits a new infinite class of regular polyhedra, which are the hosohedra. All these spherical lunes share two common vertices.

Kaleidoscopic symmetry 
The reflection domains can be shown by alternately colored lunes as mirror images.

Bisecting each lune into two spherical triangles creates an -gonal bipyramid, which represents the dihedral symmetry , order .

Relationship with the Steinmetz solid 
The tetragonal hosohedron is topologically equivalent to the bicylinder Steinmetz solid, the intersection of two cylinders at right-angles.

Derivative polyhedra 
The dual of the n-gonal hosohedron {2, n} is the n-gonal dihedron, {n, 2}. The polyhedron {2,2} is self-dual, and is both a hosohedron and a dihedron.  

A hosohedron may be modified in the same manner as the other polyhedra to produce a truncated variation. The truncated n-gonal hosohedron is the n-gonal prism.

Apeirogonal hosohedron 
In the limit, the hosohedron becomes an apeirogonal hosohedron as a 2-dimensional tessellation:

Hosotopes 

Multidimensional analogues in general are called hosotopes. A regular hosotope with Schläfli symbol {2,p,...,q} has two vertices, each with a vertex figure {p,...,q}.

The two-dimensional hosotope, {2}, is a digon.

Etymology 
The term “hosohedron” appears to derive from the Greek ὅσος (hosos) “as many”, the idea being that a hosohedron can have “as many faces as desired”. It was introduced by Vito Caravelli in the eighteenth century.

See also 

 Polyhedron
 Polytope

References 

 
 Coxeter, H.S.M, Regular Polytopes (third edition), Dover Publications Inc.,

External links

Polyhedra
Tessellation
Regular polyhedra